Ballapitiya (Sinhala:බැල්ලපිටිය, Tamil:பெல்லாபிட்டிய) is a small town in Kalutara District, Western Province, Sri Lanka.

The town is located on the Horana - Anguruwatota - Aluthgama Road (B157), near its junction with the Nagoda - Kalawellawa - Ballapitiya Road (B304), with public transport links to Kalutara, Horana, Matugama and Kandy. 

There are two schools in the area, Ballapitiya Primary School and Remuna Maha Vidyalaya.

Education 
 Ballapitiya Primary School

References 

Towns in Western Province, Sri Lanka
Populated places in Kalutara District